Cornelius Brown (born February 26, 1988) is an American former gridiron football cornerback. He played in the National Football League (NFL) for the Indianapolis Colts during the 2010 NFL season. He played college football at the University of Texas at El Paso (UTEP).

Biography
Brown was born in Houston, Texas, and attended Forest Brook High School. Brown was a four-year letterman for the UTEP Miners football team. He played 48 career games at defensive back and totaled 130 tackles. He also had 24 passes defensed, which is tied for second-most in school history, and was the MVP of the Texas vs The Nation game played on February 6, 2010.

Brown was signed as a free agent with the Chicago Bears on April 25, 2010, before being waived on September 4, 2010. He was signed to the Indianapolis Colts practice squad two days later, on September 6. He was signed as a free agent for the Colts on November 1, 2010. With the 2010 Indianapolis Colts, Brown played in 10 NFL games, registering 22 total tackles (17 solo). He also returned five kicks, for a total of 102 yards.

Brown later rejoined the Bears on June 15, 2012. He was waived by Chicago on August 31. On April 8, 2013, Brown was signed by the San Diego Chargers. He was signed to the practice roster of the Hamilton Tiger-Cats of the Canadian Football League (CFL) on June 23, 2014. He was released by the Tiger-Cats on November 14, 2014.

References

External links
Indianapolis Colts bio
ESPN bio
CBS Sports bio

1988 births
Living people
American football cornerbacks
UTEP Miners football players
Chicago Bears players
Indianapolis Colts players
San Diego Chargers players
Forest Brook High School alumni